This list of people executed in New York gives the names of some of the people executed in New York, both before and after statehood in the United States (including as New Amsterdam), as well as the person's date of execution, method of execution, and the name of the Governor of New York at the date of execution.  1963 marked the last execution in New York State. Some executions recorded during the 17th and 18th centuries do not indicate the name(s) of the executed and therefore are not included.

Regarding electrocutions, which comprise a large percentage of the executions: 
 55 people (54 men and 1 woman) were electrocuted at Auburn Correctional Facility 
 26 men were electrocuted at Clinton Correctional Facility
 614 people (including 8 women) were electrocuted at Sing Sing

1600 – 1799

1800 – 1899

1900 – 1963 

As a result of several United States Supreme Court decisions, capital punishment was suspended in the United States from 1972 through 1976.

Since 24 June 2004, the New York State death penalty statute has been declared unconstitutional by the New York Court of Appeals.

See also
 Capital punishment in New York (state)
 Capital punishment in the United States

References
 42. ^ 1860: William Fee, the only person hanged in Wayne County; 
43. ^ William Fee, charged with the murder of an unknown woman near Clyde, N.Y.

External links
 http://www.executedtoday.com/2011/07/07/1891-new-york-electric-chair/
 http://www.rootsweb.ancestry.com/~nycleroy/Prisons/Executions.pdf

Executed
Lists of people executed in the United States
New York (state)-related lists